Malabika Pramanik is a Canadian mathematician who works as a professor of mathematics at the University of British Columbia. Her interests include harmonic analysis, complex variables, and partial differential equations.

Education and career 
Pramanik studied statistics at the Indian Statistical Institute, earning a bachelor's degree in 1993 and a master's in 1995. She then moved to the University of California, Berkeley, where she completed a doctorate in mathematics in 2001. After short-term positions at the University of Wisconsin, University of Rochester, and California Institute of Technology, she joined the UBC faculty in 2006. She was appointed director of BIRS in 2020.

Recognition
Pramanik is the 2015–2016 winner of the Ruth I. Michler Memorial Prize  of the Association for Women in Mathematics, and
the 2016 winner of the Krieger–Nelson Prize, given annually by the Canadian Mathematical Society to an outstanding female researcher in mathematics.
In 2018 the Canadian Mathematical Society listed her in their inaugural class of fellows. She was named a Fellow of the American Mathematical Society, in the 2022 class of fellows, "for contributions to complex and harmonic analysis and mentoring and support for the participation of under-represented groups in mathematics".

References

External links
Home page

Year of birth missing (living people)
Living people
Canadian mathematicians
Women mathematicians
University of California, Berkeley alumni
Academic staff of the University of British Columbia
University of Rochester faculty
California Institute of Technology faculty
University of Wisconsin–Madison faculty
21st-century Canadian women scientists
Fellows of the Canadian Mathematical Society
Fellows of the American Mathematical Society